Hongouyeh (also Romanized as Hongū’īyeh, Hongūyeh, Hongooyeh, and Hongūyeh; also known as Hongū, Hongūh, and Hungu) is a city in Faramarzan Rural District, Jenah District, Bastak County, Hormozgan Province, Iran. At the 2006 census, its population was 3,800, in 735 families.

References 

Populated places in Bastak County